The 1976–77 Minnesota North Stars season was the North Stars' tenth season.

Coached by Ted Harris, the team compiled a record of 23–39–18 for 64 points, to finish the regular season 2nd in the Smythe Division. In the playoffs they lost the Preliminary Round 2–0 to the Buffalo Sabres.

Offseason

Regular season

Final standings

Schedule and results

Playoffs

Player statistics

Awards and records

Transactions

Draft picks
Minnesota's draft picks at the 1976 NHL Amateur Draft held in Montreal, Quebec.

Farm teams

See also
1976–77 NHL season

References

External links

Minnesota North Stars seasons
Minnesota North Stars
Minnesota North Stars
Minnesota North Stars
Minnesota North Stars